Hattori Yūji (born 20 August 1960 as Yūji Hattori) is a former sumo wrestler from Obu, Aichi, Japan. While an amateur at Doshisha University he won a then–record seventeen collegiate sumo titles. He joined Isenoumi stable and for a time used the prestigious shikona Fujinokawa, the fighting name of Isenoumi Oyakata, ex sekiwake Fujinokawa Takeo. He made his professional debut in March 1983 and reached the top division in March 1985. However, he was very injury–prone and never made the san'yaku ranks, his highest rank being maegashira 3. He left the sumo world upon retirement from active competition in July 1987 at the age of just 26. He later became a sumo commentator.

Career record

See also
Glossary of sumo terms
List of past sumo wrestlers

References

1960 births
Living people
Japanese sumo wrestlers
People from Ōbu, Aichi
Sumo people from Aichi Prefecture